is a Japanese actress and model affiliated with the Ten Carat talent agency. She is best known for her role as Kagura (ToQ 5gou) in the 2014 Super Sentai series Ressha Sentai ToQger.

Career
Moritaka started modeling while still at elementary school. She was an exclusive model for the teenage fashion magazine Love Berry from 2011, and for  Pichi Lemon from 2012.

She began her acting career in the 2012 TBS drama Beginners!. She then starred in the NHK drama Gekiryu: Watashi o Oboete Imasu ka? as the female protagonist's young counterpart, before being cast as Kagura Izumi/ToQ 5gou in Ressha Sentai ToQger in 2014. In 2019, she would reprise her role for Super Sentai Strongest Battle.

Filmography

TV series
Beginners! (TBS / 2012), Manatsu Shimura 
Gekiryu: Watashi o Oboete Imasu ka? (NHK / 2013), Keiko (Misumi) Inoue (teenage years)
Ressha Sentai ToQger (TV Asahi / 2014), Kagura
Tantei No Tantei (TV Fuji/2015)

Films
Zyuden Sentai Kyoryuger vs. Go-Busters: The Great Dinosaur Battle! Farewell Our Eternal Friends (2014), ToQ 5gou (voice)
Heisei Rider vs. Shōwa Rider: Kamen Rider Taisen feat. Super Sentai (2014), Kagura
Ressha Sentai ToQger the Movie: Galaxy Line S.O.S. (2014), Kagura

References

External links
Official profile at Ten Carat 
Pichi Lemon Official profile 

21st-century Japanese actresses
Japanese female models
1998 births
Living people
Actors from Saitama Prefecture
Models from Saitama Prefecture